Hugo Lehner (1902 – 14 October 1952) was a Swiss mountain guide and skier. He competed together with Fritz Kuhn, Otto Furrer and Anton Julen in military patrol at the second winter Olympics in St. Moritz in 1928, where the team placed third.

Lehner also performed in famous movies such as Struggle for the Matterhorn (1928), in which he portrayed Charles Hudson, The Call of the North (1929), Mountains on Fire (1931) and The Rebel (1932).

Selected filmography
 Struggle for the Matterhorn (1928)
 The Call of the North (1929)
 Mountains on Fire (1931)
 The Rebel (1932)

References

External links 
 
 Filmography
 Postcard: Hugo Lehner

1902 births
1952 deaths
Swiss military patrol (sport) runners
Olympic biathletes of Switzerland
Military patrol competitors at the 1928 Winter Olympics
Alpine guides
Swiss male silent film actors
20th-century Swiss male actors